Johan Barthold Jongkind (3 June 1819 – 9 February 1891) was a Dutch painter and printmaker. He painted marine landscapes in a free manner and is regarded as a forerunner of Impressionism.

Biography

Jongkind was born in the town of Lattrop in the Overijssel province of the Netherlands near the border with Germany. Trained at the art academy in The Hague under Andreas Schelfhout, in 1846 he moved to Montparnasse in Paris, France where he studied under Eugène Isabey and François-Édouard Picot. Two years later, the Paris Salon accepted his work for its exhibition, and he received acclaim from critic Charles Baudelaire and later on from Émile Zola. He was to experience little success, however, and he suffered bouts of depression complicated by alcoholism.

Jongkind returned to live in Rotterdam in 1855, and remained there until 1860. Back in Paris, in 1861 he rented a studio on the rue de Chevreuse in Montparnasse where some of his paintings began to show glimpses of the Impressionist style to come. In 1862 he met in Normandy, in the famous ferme Saint-Siméon in Honfleur, with some of his artist friends, such as Alfred Sisley, Eugène Boudin, and the young Claude Monet, to all of whom Jongkind served as a mentor.  Monet later referred to him as "...a quiet man with such a talent that is beyond words" and credited the "definitive education" of his own eye to Jongkind. In 1863 Jongkind exhibited at the first Salon des Refusés. He was invited to participate in the first exhibition of the Impressionist group in 1874, but he declined.

In 1878, Jongkind and his companion Joséphine Fesser moved to live in the small town of La Côte-Saint-André near Grenoble in the Isère département in the southeast of France. He died in 1891 in Saint-Égrève, in the same département. He is buried in the cemetery of La Côte-Saint-André. Streets are named after him in some Dutch town quarters dedicated to 19th- and 20th-century Dutch painters in e.g. Overtoomse Veld-Noord, Amsterdam, and De Vijfhoek, Deventer.

Commemoration
On 2 June 2019, a statue of Jongkind made by Dutch sculptor Rob Houdijk was revealed in the Duifpolder between Maassluis and Vlaardingen alongside the Vlaardingertrekvaart canal, on the occasion of the 200th anniversary of his birth. At this spot, Jongkind must have made preparatory sketches of the Rechthuis van Zouteveen for one of his later etching ‘Les deux barques à voile’ from 1862.

Subject and style
Jongkind's most frequent subject was the marine landscape, which he painted both in the Netherlands and in France. Many of his works depict the Seine, particularly the area near Notre-Dame Cathedral. He painted watercolors out-of-doors, and used them as sketches for oil paintings made in his studio. His paintings are characterized by vigorous brushwork and strong contrasts. Like the 17th-century Dutch landscape painters of the Golden Age of Dutch painting, he typically composed his landscapes with a low horizon, allowing the sky to dominate.

Selected paintings

Bibliographies
 Ankelle, Daniel (2011): Johan Jonkind: 75 Impressionist Paintings - Impressionisme, Angelke Publishing LLC, ASIN: B005VU2H1Y.
 Auffret, François (2003): Jongkind 1819-1891 - Biographie Illustrée, Maisonneuve et Larose, Paris, .
 Czymmek, Götz, Jaques Foucart John Sillevis u. a. (2004): Johan Barthold Jongkind: Ein Wegbereiter des Impressionismus, Ausstellungskatalog Richartz Wallraf Museum, Köln, .
Hefting, Victorine (1975). Jongkind—sa vie, son œuvre, son époque. Paris: Arts et métiers graphiques.
 Patin, Sylvie (2014): Jongkind - une Fascination pour La Lumière, Édition des Falaises, Rouen, .
 Sillevis, John (2003): Jongkind Paintings, Bibliothèque De L'image, Paris, .
Stein, Adolphe. Jongkind—catalogue critique de l'oeuvre. (2003 volume 1) Paris: Brame & Lorenceau. .

Notes

References
Boorsch, Suzanne, and John Marciari (2006). Master Drawings from the Yale University Art Gallery. Yale University Press. 
Hefting, Victorine. "Johan Barthold Jongkind", Oxford Art Online
University of California, Riverside, Los Angeles County Museum, & University of California, Riverside. (1974). The Impressionists and the Salon (1874-1886) honoring the centennial of the first impressionist exhibition: California collections. Riverside, Calif.

External links

 Association of the Friends of Jongkind (Société des amis de Jongkind)
 Biography of Johann Jongkind (includes a selection of his paintings)
 In the Steps of Jongkind in the Dauphiné (Dans les pas de Jongkind en Dauphiné)
 Biography notes and dates of Jongkind, in the Dutch R.K.D. Archive, The Hague
 Many free images of paintings, drawings and prints of Jongkind, in the Rijksmuseum, Amsterdam
 Jongkind's painting art in Musee d'Orsay, Paris 

1819 births
1891 deaths
19th-century Dutch painters
19th-century printmakers
Dutch expatriates in France
Dutch Impressionist painters
Dutch male painters
Dutch marine artists
Dutch printmakers
People from Lattrop
19th-century Dutch male artists